Hulbert is a surname. Notable people with the surname include:

Claude Hulbert (1900–1964), British comic actor
George Murray Hulbert (1881–1950), U.S. politician and judge
Henry L. Hulbert (1867–1918), U.S. Marine, Medal of Honor recipient
Homer Hulbert (1863-1949), American activist for Korean independence
Jack Hulbert (1892–1978), British comic actor
Lloyd Hulbert (1918–1986), U.S. biologist
Mark Hulbert (born 1955), American finance analyst
Mike Hulbert (born 1958), American golfer
Norman Hulbert (1903–1972), British politician
Robin Hulbert (born 1980), British football player
Sam Hulbert (1936–2016), American academic administrator
William Davenport Hulbert (1868–1913), American naturalist
William Hulbert (1832–1882), American baseball administrator